Macroxenodes is a genus of bristly millipedes in the family Polyxenidae. There are at least four described species in Macroxenodes.

Species
These four species belong to the genus Macroxenodes:
 Macroxenodes amazonicus Ishii, Jacquemin-Nguyen Duy & Condé, 1999
 Macroxenodes bartschi (Chamberlin, 1922)
 Macroxenodes meinerti (Silvestri, 1898)
 Macroxenodes poecilus (Chamberlin, 1923)

References

Further reading

 
 

Polyxenida
Articles created by Qbugbot